Derek John Lister (25 August 1930 – 27 November 1980) was an English first-class cricketer.

Born at Norwood, Lister played minor counties cricket for Wiltshire in 1951, making two appearances in the Minor Counties Championship. He later studied at the University of Cambridge, where he made a single appearance in first-class cricket for Cambridge University against Middlesex at Fenner's in 1954. Batting twice during the match, Lister was dismissed by Ronnie Bell for 31 runs in the Cambridge first-innings, while in their second-innings he was dismissed for 4 runs by Charles Robins. He died at Northampton in November 1980.

References

External links

1930 births
1980 deaths
People from South Norwood
Alumni of the University of Cambridge
English cricketers
Wiltshire cricketers
Cambridge University cricketers